Lyudmila Nikolayevna Vasilyeva was a Chuvash poet (March 15, 1930 – June 11, 1949).

Born to a family of Hvetut Mikulajĕ (aka Atnakăl Mikulajĕ), a teacher in the Chuvash village of Tarhanka, Tatarstan.

Life
The father Hvetut Mikulajĕ, appointed the head of the collective farm was poisoned by the local doctor in revenge for being fired.

The mother, Antun Kĕterni was an illiterate peasant. The widowed young woman also lost two of her daughters - besides Lyudmila, the elder daughter also died young at the age of 24 of flu.

Lyudmila started attending Tarhanka Elementary School in 1938. In 1942, having graduated four grades of the elementary school she had to work at the collective farm because the family was poor. In 1945 she was at once accepted to the sixth grade of seven-grade school, which she completed brilliantly.

Lyudmila then attended accountancy classes in Agricultural School of Chistaj. But after year she gave it up and went to the Teachers Training College in the town of Aksu.

The girl was indulged in sports. She was good at skiing, won local competitions. Once after a skiing competition she being thirsty drank water right from ice-hole. That resulted in a severe fatal disease.

As complications set in and she couldn’t even walk she was taken to the hospital of Chistaj. They didn’t want hospitalize her as her condition was too bad. But she insisted, saying: “I’ll die in the corridor, but won’t go away!” After two months in hospital she never recovered, and they sent her home. In sixth month she started bleeding from the mouth and died.

Lyudmila was a beautiful nice girl. Black-eyed, slim and shapely she attracted many. At the funeral one of her admirers couldn’t help and fall onto her coffin bursting in tears.

Works
Four days before her death she wrote 620 lines of «Асăнмалăх» (In Memory), a poem about of her life, which was published in many Chuvash magazines and newspapers.

External links
 «Асăнмалăх» (In Memory) poem in the Chuvash language.

Chuvash writers
1930 births
1949 deaths
Chuvash-language poets
20th-century Russian poets
20th-century Russian women writers
Russian women poets
Soviet women poets